The Mazda Pathfinder XV-1, commonly called the Mazda Jeep, is a 4x4  Mazda built from 1970 to 1973 in an assembly plant in Myanmar strictly for Myanma market. The Pathfinder XV-1's were used mostly by Military of Myanmar, police and government officials.  They were later sold to the public.

The Pathfinder XV-1 was designed in Hiroshima, but the vehicle was exclusively assembled and sold in Myanmar only.

History
The vehicle was manufactured in the 1970s in Myanmar as Complete Knockdown unit starting from Salane Number plates. Later a factory was established in Htonebo Pyay for semi knock down units and gradually to the assembly with local made parts.

Design
The Pathfinder XV-1s were sold in Myanmar in bright green. Other color variants exist such as metallic blue, blue, light metallic green were produced in later parts of 90s although original color was bright green. The original versions were produced with short body powered by 2000cc engine having a model called VA. Later long body version was introduced. The body was extended with Rivets. The original gasoline engine was designed with double coil and double ignition points with sealed Ignition System to be able to stand water. Long body version was called 5 hook version. Those cars were not available to the public till the 90s.

Another Variant called Path Finder was introduced with fiber roof top, long body and two gasoline tanks powered by same VA Engine with 2000cc. The power is rather not enough for those long body versions due to the weight of frame and body. Most engines for the car are based on VA engine which is used in E2000, T2000 for three decades. Later some Korean diesel engines and chinese engines were introduced. Some modified or repowered the car with Toyota 2C diesel engine for some periods.

Those cars were given to high rank officials during 70s till 2000s. The unique spray pattern of body from original version could not be mimicked at outside body repair shops. The front end's leaf spring is of reverse type. Most front axle joints were disassembled by users due to fuel economy issue. Original versions came in Yokohama tires and the vehicle can top around 70MPH having a 80MPH limit. Later models were used with local made tires which produced a lot of tire noise. The car has a high center of gravity and tends to roll over in rainy slippery conditions.

Variants
The Pathfinder XV-1 came as either soft-tops or hard-tops, and could seat up to nine people on a pair of large folding benches in the rear. The Pathfinder XV-1's came in long or short wheelbase versions with a canvas roof. 

Some hardtop SWB versions were also made, as were four-door LWB wagons (the LWB canvas-top cars were always two-door).

Notes

 
Off-road vehicles